Sir Thomas Fulton Wilson McKillop, FRS, FRSE (born 19 March 1943) is a Scottish chemist, who was CEO of AstraZeneca PLC from 1999 until 2006 and chairman of the RBS Group from 2006 until 2008.

Early life
McKillop was born in Dreghorn, a small village in North Ayrshire. He was educated at Irvine Royal Academy and then Glasgow University, where he took a BSc (Hons) and PhD in chemistry. He joined the ICI Petrochemical & Polymer Laboratory (later renamed the ICI Corporate Laboratory) at Runcorn in 1969 after post-doctoral research work in Paris. He moved to ICI Pharmaceuticals Division in 1975 and, having held a number of positions in research, in 1989 he was appointed technical director of ICI with international responsibilities for research, development and production.

Zeneca
In 1993, ICI Pharmaceuticals demerged to become Zeneca, and in 1994 he was appointed chief executive officer of the new company. In April 1999, Zeneca merged with Astra to form AstraZeneca PLC. McKillop became chief executive officer (CEO) of the merged company. He retired from AstraZeneca on 1 January 2006, when David Brennan took over as AstraZeneca's CEO. McKillop became the chairman of the Royal Bank of Scotland (RBS). His brother, Alexander McKillop, was professor of organic chemistry at the University of East Anglia from 1970 to 1996.

RBS

McKillop then changed from chemistry to banking in 2006. He was chairman RBS from when it accrued a debt of £45 billion, working with CEO Fred Goodwin, who promoted aggressive expansion of the bank by acquiring other banks.

On 13 October 2008, British Prime Minister Gordon Brown announced a UK government bailout of £45 billion of new capital into Royal Bank of Scotland. RBS has accrued a further debt of £58 billion since 2008.

By 2008 RBS was the fifth-largest bank in the world by market capitalisation. It rose while aggressively pursuing leveraged buyouts which include debt transferral of acquired companies; for example RBS acquired ABN Amro for €71 billion, while ABN transpired to be worth only half of that. RBS Directors contracted that ABN could keep its collection of priceless art assets as part of the deal. In 2008 RBS also lent $9.3bn, more than double its nearest rival.

From the time that Goodwin took over as chief executive until 2007, RBS's assets quadrupled, its cost-to-income ratio improved markedly, and its profits soared. In 2006 pre-tax profits climbed 16% to £9.2 billion with most of the growth coming from its investment banking business.

However, following a shareholder crisis meeting in the midst of a $12bn rights issue, Tom was criticized for "re-arranging the cosy deck-chairs on the sinking titanic", and Goodwin was criticised by RBS shareholders for selling shares at half the price of the shareholder's given value. Having nearly trebled between February 2000 and May 2002 the share price halved from 2006 to 2008. It had lost 95% of its value by 2009. Goodwin was accused of megalomania by some shareholders, as reported by Dresdner Kleinwort analyst James Eden (who said he thought the label was 'unwarranted'). After the Bank of China deal, he was forced to promise RBS shareholders he would not indulge in any further big acquisitions and focus instead on growing the group organically.

However, in early 2007, the Dutch bank ABN AMRO was under pressure from hedge funds, including Chris Hohn of the hedge fund TCI, to break itself up to maximise shareholder value. ABN chief executive Rijkman Groenink suspected RBS of acting in concert with the hedge fund Tosca, which was chaired by former RBS chairman Mathewson and recommended the takeover bid of an RBS consortium for €71 billion, against the proposed merger with Barclays Bank for €61 billion. Goodwin arranged a consortium of RBS, Fortis and former RBS shareholders Grupo Santander, to purchase the assets of ABN AMRO and break them up in a three-way split. According to the proposed deal, RBS would take over ABN's Chicago operations, LaSalle Bank, and ABN's wholesale operations; while Santander would take the Brazilian operations and Fortis would take the Dutch operations. In a manoeuvre "labelled in all quarters as a poison pill" ABN AMRO agreed to sell key RBS target LaSalle to Bank of America for $21bn, but in July 2007 the consortium offered the same $98bn for ABN's remaining assets, with a higher cash component (93%).

The deal was struck in October 2007 as the global liquidity crisis began to develop, with Barclays withdrawing its EUR61bn bid and ABN's shareholders endorsing the EUR71bn RBS takeover. Coming after the nationalisation of Northern Rock due to the freezing of the wholesale money markets, the deal proved the final straw for RBS, as it severely weakened its balance sheet not only through the size of the acquisition but due to ABN AMRO's substantial exposure to the US subprime mortgage crisis.

While at RBS, the value of the bank's shares fell below a quarter of their level in early 2007. Following criticism from the press for the takeover of ABN AMRO and the UK government having to bail out the bank, McKillop announced his early retirement as chairman of the Royal Bank of Scotland on 13 October 2008. At a meeting of the Treasury Select Committee of the House of Commons on 10 February 2009, he admitted to having no qualifications in banking. Like the retired bankers present, he apologised for the bankruptcy for RBS.

Family
Thomas married Elizabeth Kettle in 1966. He also has 8 grandchildren.

Awards
 2002 Knighted in the 2002 Queen's Birthday honour's list for services to the pharmaceuticals industry.
 2003 Elected Fellow of the Royal Society of Edinburgh
 June 2004 – awarded an honorary doctor of Sciences by the University of St Andrews
 2005 Elected Fellow of the Royal Society
 2005 Annual Centenary Medal, Society of Chemical Industry
 2006 Honorary Doctorate from Heriot-Watt University
 2007 Royal Medal of the Royal Society of Edinburgh

Other positions
 Non-executive director of BP, having been a non-executive director of Lloyds TSB Group plc from 1999 to 2004
 Chairman of the British Pharma Group
 Pro-chancellor of the University of Leicester
 Vice-president of the European Federation of Pharmaceutical Industries and Associations
 Chairman of the North West Science Council.
 President of the Science Council (January 2007)
 Board of Administration Evolva

See also
The Royal Bank of Scotland

References

External links

1943 births
Living people
Knights Bachelor
BP people
Fellows of the Royal Society
Fellows of the Royal Society of Edinburgh
People educated at Irvine Royal Academy
People from North Ayrshire
Alumni of the University of Glasgow
INSEAD alumni
AstraZeneca people
Businesspeople in the pharmaceutical industry
Imperial Chemical Industries people
People associated with the University of Leicester
NatWest Group people
Scottish chairpersons of corporations
Scottish chemists